In computing, sequential access memory (SAM) is a class of data storage devices that read stored data in a sequence. This is in contrast to random access memory (RAM) where data can be accessed in any order. Sequential access devices are usually a form of magnetic storage or optical storage.

While sequential access memory is read in sequence, arbitrary locations can still be accessed by "seeking" to the requested location. This operation, however, is often relatively inefficient (see seek time, rotational latency).

Magnetic sequential access memory is typically used for secondary storage in general-purpose computers due to their higher density at lower cost compared to RAM, as well as resistance to wear and non-volatility. Magnetic tape is a type of sequential access memory still in use; historically, drum memory has also been used.

See also 

 Sequential access
 Basic sequential access method (BSAM)
 Queued sequential access method (QSAM)
 Secondary storage
 Hard disk drive
 Solid state drive
 Magnetic storage
 Magnetic tape
 Drum memory
 Locality of reference
 Streaming media

References 

Computer memory